James Edward Bowman Jr. (February 5, 1923 – September 28, 2011) was an American physician and specialist in pathology, hematology, and genetics.  He was a professor of pathology and genetics at the Pritzker School of Medicine at the University of Chicago. He published more than ninety works across the fields of human genetics; population genetics; and ethical, legal and public policy issues in human genetics. He received many awards, including the Chicago African American History Makers Award and recognition from the Hastings Center and Stanford’s Kaiser Family Foundation, and Howard University.

Early life and education
James Edward Bowman was born on February 5, 1923, in Washington, D.C., the eldest of five children of Dorothy Bowman (née Peterson), a homemaker, and James Edward Bowman Sr., a dentist. His parents were African-American. He attended Dunbar High School before earning his undergraduate and medical degrees from Howard University in 1943 and 1946.  He did internships at Freedmen's Hospital in Washington, D.C. and at Provident Hospital in Chicago. His residency in pathology was at St. Luke's Hospital in Chicago where he was the first African American resident, and was certified by the American Board of Pathology in pathologic anatomy (1951) and clinical pathology (1952).

Career 
Following residency, Bowman served as chair of pathology at Provident Hospital in Chicago. He was drafted again and spent 1953 to 1955 as chief of pathology for the Medical Nutrition Laboratory at Fitzsimons Army Hospital in Aurora, Colorado. After leaving the military he moved overseas. "My wife and I decided that we were not going to go back to anything that smacked of segregation," he recalled. He became chair of pathology at Nemazee Hospital in Shiraz, Iran. "We were recently married, so we took a chance," he said. "It changed our lives completely." Their daughter, Valerie, was born in Iran.

In Iran, Bowman saw many diseases for the first time. "I saw smallpox, brucellosis, rabies, all sorts of things," he said. One of the most common diseases among certain ethnic groups in Iran was glucose-6-phosphate dehydrogenase deficiency favism, an Inborn error of metabolism metabolic disease caused by an enzyme deficiency in red blood cells. The mutation, which is the most common human enzyme defect, renders those who have it unable to break down a toxin found in fava beans. This led to a   series of important discoveries about the genetics of inherited blood diseases and the populations they affect, especially in the Middle East, Africa and America. It enabled him to travel all over the world collecting blood samples for DNA testing. It also led to frequent contacts and collaborations with University of Chicago researchers, who had first described the enzyme deficiency (glucose-6-phosphate dehydrogenase deficiency, or G6PD) and its connection with antimalarial medications.

Bowman joined the faculty of the University of Chicago in 1962 as  assistant professor of medicine and pathology and director of the hospital's blood bank. He was promoted to full professor and director of laboratories in 1971. From 1973 to 1984, he directed the university's Comprehensive Sickle Cell Center, funded by the National Institutes of Health. He was a member of the national advisory group that urged the Nixon administration to initiate the inception of the Comprehensive Sickle Cell Center, which served as a model of patient-centered disease management and research. He also served as assistant dean of students for minority affairs for the Pritzker School of Medicine from 1986 to 1990.

In 1972, Bowman stated that mandatory sickle cell screening laws were "more harmful than beneficial." These laws could "revive many of the past misadventures and racism of eugenics movements," he argued at the time, adding that adult screening programs create "inaccurate, misleading, politically motivated propaganda which has left mothers frantic." In 1973, he was named to two federal review committees designed to oversee sickle cell screening and education and to evaluate laboratory diagnostic techniques.

He was the first tenured African-American professor in the University of Chicago's Biological Sciences Division. Upon his death, the University of Chicago established the Bowman Society as an advising group to support minority scholars pursuing careers in the biomedical sciences and to organize a regular lecture series. In 2020, the University appointed the first distinguished professorship in his hono , the James E. Bowman Jr. Professor in the Biological Sciences in the Department of Medicine.

Personal life 
Bowman was married to educator Barbara Bowman and they had one daughter, Valerie Bowman Jarrett, who was a Senior Advisor to President Barack Obama.

Bowman died of cancer on September 28, 2011, at the University of Chicago Medical Center, at the age of 88.

Selected publications
Bowman published numerous articles and books, including:

Books

Journal articles

See also
List of African American inventors and scientists

Notes

1923 births
2011 deaths
American geneticists
Howard University alumni
People from Chicago
University of Chicago faculty
African-American physicians
American pathologists
Hastings Center Fellows
Dunbar High School (Washington, D.C.) alumni
American expatriates in Iran
20th-century African-American people
21st-century African-American people